Gordon Adam Haidy (April 11, 1928 – October 6, 2004) was a Canadian ice hockey right wing. He played one playoff game in the National Hockey League with the Detroit Red Wings on April 4, 1950 against the Toronto Maple Leafs. The rest of his career, which lasted from 1945 to 1964, was spent in the minor leagues.

Gord Haidy is one of the first three hockey players who played their only NHL game in the playoffs for a Stanley Cup winning and Calder's Cup winning teams.

Career statistics

Regular season and playoffs

See also
 List of players who played only one game in the NHL

External links
 

1928 births
2004 deaths
Buffalo Bisons (AHL) players
Canadian ice hockey right wingers
Detroit Red Wings players
Ice hockey people from Ontario
Indianapolis Capitals players
Indianapolis Chiefs players
Milwaukee Falcons players
New Westminster Royals players
Omaha Knights (USHL) players
Ontario Hockey Association Senior A League (1890–1979) players
Sportspeople from Windsor, Ontario
Windsor Spitfires players